Stelzer is a surname. Notable people with the surname include:

Adolf Stelzer (1908–1977), Swiss footballer
Andrea Stelzer (born c. 1965), South African beauty queen
Hannes Stelzer (1910–1944), Austrian film actor
Howard Stelzer (born 1974), American classical composer
Irwin Stelzer (born 1932), American economist 
Michael Stelzer (born 1964), American judge
Simone Stelzer (born 1969), Austrian pop singer
 Thomas Stelzer (diplomat), Austrian diplomat
 Thomas Stelzer (politician), governor of Upper Austria

See also
Stelzer engine, is a two-stroke opposing-piston free-piston engine design proposed by Frank Stelzer

References

Surnames from nicknames